Bolitoglossa psephena is a lungless salamander in the family Plethodontidae. It is endemic to Guatemala and only known from its type locality, Finca Santa Elena near Chimaltenango. The specific name is derived from the Greek psephena, meaning dark or obscure, and refers to the uniformly dark coloration of this small salamander.

Description
The holotype is a female that measures  in snout–vent length. The snout is rounded in dorsal profile. The dorsum is uniformly dark in preservative and medium brown, with a faint trace of paler brown mottling on the flanks, when photographed in life. Both finger and toe tips are broad and blunt. The terminal phalanges of the fingers are free of webbing. The toe webbing extends to the base of the terminal segments.

Habitat and conservation
The forest is abundant with pines, cypress, firs, oaks, alders, and laurels. As of 2010, the area had good forest patches remaining. As of late 2020, this species had not been assessed for the IUCN Red List of Threatened Species.

References

psephena
Amphibians of Guatemala
Endemic fauna of Guatemala
Amphibians described in 2010
Taxa named by Jonathan A. Campbell